Mardinli Mosque (sometimes transliterated as Merdinli Mosque) was an Azerbaijani mosque located in Shusha, Karabakh region of Azerbaijan about 350 km from capital Baku. The mosque was located on intersection of Sadigjan and Garasherov streets of Mardinli neighborhood of Shusha. Mardinli neighbourhood is one of 8 upper and earlier neighbourhoods of Shusha. In total, there are 17 neighbourhoods. Mardinli Mosque was one of the 17th mosques functioning in Shusha by the end of the 19th century. Mardinli mosque was located in the World Heritage Site of Shusha State Historical and Architectural Reserve.

See also
Yukhari Govhar Agha Mosque
Ashaghi Govhar Agha Mosque
Saatli Mosque
Seyidli Mosque
Khoja Marjanli Mosque
Guyulug Mosque
Taza Mahalla Mosque
Mamayi Mosque

References

External links

Mardinli street in Mardinli neighbourhood of Shusha
Ruins of Shusha publishing house in Mardinli neighbourhood
Shirin Su (Sweet water) bath house
Ruins of Mardinli district
Ruins of 18th century buildings in Mardinli district
Karabakh Monuments

19th-century mosques
Mosques in Shusha